Gaycation (also known as Gaycation with Elliot Page) is a 2016 American television documentary series hosted by Elliot Page and Ian Daniel. The series premiered on 2 March 2016 on Viceland as part of its new programming launch. The series explores LGBTQ cultures around the world, as Page and Daniel meet different people during their travels and hear their stories.

Development
Gaycation was introduced as part of the programming launch of Vice Media's new channel, Viceland. The series was originally conceived when Spike Jonze, as the co-president of Viceland, approached Elliot Page and requested input on possible show ideas for the new channel; they suggested a travel show with an LGBT perspective. After Jonze recommended that Page be accompanied by a companion during the series, Page suggested Ian Daniel, a personal friend who had experience as an art curator and worked as the director of artistic programs at The Civilians Theater Company, to be brought on as a co-host.

The series was renewed for a second season in 2016.

Production
Filming for the first season began June 2015, in New York City. Notably, Page's attempt to interview Ted Cruz at the Iowa State Fair was recorded by bystanders and went viral; the exchange would appear in the United States episode of the series. Each of the episodes were made available for online viewing shortly after each episode's premiere.

Filming for season 2 began in March 2016. A special episode aired on August 24, 2016, focusing on the aftermath of the mass shooting that occurred at the Pulse nightclub in Orlando, Florida. The second season began airing on September 7, 2016. In January 2017, the series was nominated for a GLAAD Media Award for Outstanding Reality Program.

Series overview

Episodes

Season 1 (2016)

Special (2016)

Season 2 (2016)

Special (2017)

Accolades 
{| class="wikitable sortable" style="width: 100%;"
|- style="text-align:center;"
! width="1%"| Year
! width="20%"| Award
! width="25%"| Category
! width="35%"| Nominee(s)
! width="1%"| Result
! width="1%" class="unsortable" | 
|-
|2016
|68th Primetime Emmy Awards
| Outstanding Unstructured Reality Program
| Elliot Page, Spike Jonze, Nomi Ernst Leidner, Brendan Fitzgerald, Patrick Moses, Shane Smith, Eddy Moretti, William Fairman, Niharika Desai, Alex Braverman
| 
|
|-
|2017
|32nd Imagen Awards
| Best Informational Program
| Gaycation
| 
|
|-
|2017
|2017 Gold Derby Awards
| Reality Host
| Elliot Page and Ian Daniel
| 
|
|-
|2017
|69th Primetime Emmy Awards
| Outstanding Unstructured Reality Program
| Elliot Page, Ian Daniel, Spike Jonze, Niharika Desai, Nomi Ernst Leidner, Bernardo Loyola, Shane Smith, Eddy Moretti
| 
|
|-
|2017
|28th GLAAD Media Awards
| rowspan="2"| Outstanding Reality Program
| rowspan="2"| Gaycation
| 
|
|-
|2018
|29th GLAAD Media Awards
|
|

References

Notes

External links
Viceland official website

2016 web series debuts
2016 American television series debuts
2017 American television series endings
2010s American documentary television series
2010s American LGBT-related television series
Viceland original programming
Documentary web series